Vitamin Z were an English band, formed in 1982 by vocalist Geoff Barradale and bassist Nick Lockwood. Their biggest hit "Burning Flame" charted in the UK and US, but their one other hit in the UK, "Every Time That I See You", did not chart in the US. Geoff Barradale now serves as manager for the Arctic Monkeys.

History
Vitamin Z founders Geoff Barradale and Nick Lockwood were born and raised in Sheffield. The group originally took shape around a loose-knit collection of local musicians who came together in a common rehearsal space.

The band's debut album Rites of Passage, was released in 1985. Its most prominent single, "Burning Flame", produced by Chris Hughes, hit number 73 on the Billboard Hot 100, and the band toured England with Tears for Fears. Vitamin Z also made news when their video for the song "Circus Ring (We Scream About)" was filmed in Istanbul, making them the first Western Europeans to be allowed to film in Turkey since Midnight Express prompted government officials there to close the border to foreign film units.

A year or so further on and the follow-up album was ready to go. "We sat down and listened to it and it didn't do anything", recalls Barradale. "If it didn't move us, it wasn't going to move anybody else. The songs were good, but the treatment was wrong, contrived, plastic. We see ourselves as far more edgy, spiky. It was the wrong marriage with a producer."

While they awaited the results of a lawsuit that would hopefully allow them to rework the songs, they wrote a number of new ones. They liked what they were hearing so much that they paid for another demo out of their own pockets. "We knew", says Barradale, "that this was our moment. We had to take it." By the time the legal matters were settled, they were already in the studio working on Sharp Stone Rain, beginning with producer Pete Smith (Sting, The Adventures) but ended up co-producing tracks.

Also seizing the moment, Lockwood decided to move from bass and keyboards to guitar.

Barradale appeared on The Alan Parsons Project album Gaudi, released in 1987. He sang lead vocals for the "Standing on Higher Ground" lead off single.

Vitamin Z recorded demos for a third album, which was never released.

Barradale continued to record and perform from his native Sheffield, teaming up with guitarist Mick Bratby and bass player Ade Thorpe, both formerly of No Mean City and Aku Ake and later with guitarist and songwriter Alan Smyth, later a producer based at his own 2-Fly Studios in the city. Their bands Fruit, Seafruit, were championed by broadcaster Jeff Cooper's 'XS' show (now radio2XS) at the radio station Hallam FM, where they recorded two sessions in 1996 and 1997. Cooper also employed Barradale as the narrator of a 1995 radio documentary for the BBC Sheffield Music 1995, which also featured Pulp's Jarvis Cocker and others.

Geoff Barradale is the manager for the Arctic Monkeys who are also from Sheffield.

Discography

Albums
1985: Rites of Passage (Geffen Records) - US No. 183
1989: Sharp Stone Rain (Geffen Records)

Singles
1984: "Burning Flame" (7", 12") - UK No. 80, US No. 73
1985: "Circus Ring (We Scream About)" (7", 12")
1985: "Every Time That I See You" (7", 12") - UK No. 78
1985: "Hi Hi Friend" (7", 12")
1989: "Burn for You" (7", 12", CD single)
1990: "Can't Live Without You" (7", 12", CD single)

References

External links
 Vitamin Z: Official website

Musical groups from Sheffield
English synth-pop groups
English new wave musical groups
British musical trios
Musical groups established in 1982
1982 establishments in England
Geffen Records artists
Mercury Records artists
Phonogram Inc. artists